The clay-soil ctenotus (Ctenotus helenae)  is a species of skink found in Northern Territory, South Australia, and Western Australia.

References

helenae
Reptiles described in 1969
Taxa named by Glen Milton Storr